Velandia is a surname. Notable people with the surname include:

Henri Velandia (born 1983), Venezuelan dancer
Jorge Velandia (born 1975), Venezuelan baseball player